The Harvey Korman Show is an American sitcom television series starring Harvey Korman, Christine Lahti, Barry Van Dyke and Milton Selzer that aired for five episodes on ABC from January 31 to August 3, 1978.

Synopsis
Harvey A. Kavanaugh is an egotistical, self-centered, out-of-work actor who operates an acting class from his home (Harvey A. Kavanaugh Academy of Dramatic Arts) that he shares with his level-headed daughter Maggie, who works at the Friendly Community Bank.

Cast
Harvey Korman as Harvey A. Kavanaugh
Christine Lahti as Maggie Kavanaugh
Barry Van Dyke as Stuart Stafford
Milton Selzer as Jake Winkleman

Production
The Harvey Korman Show was created as a star vehicle for Harvey Korman when he was offered a contract by ABC to headline his own television series. Following his successful run as a supporting player on CBS's The Carol Burnett Show from 1967 to 1977, Korman by this time had grown restless of the variety-show routine and was keen to pursue lead-character roles.

The pilot episode was originally broadcast on May 19, 1977 and varied slightly from the 1978 series: Korman portrays Francis A. Kavanaugh, a flamboyant, old-school actor and dramatic coach of an acting class he operates from the home he shares with his 19-year-old daughter Maggie (played by Susan Lawrence in the pilot). In the actual series, Korman's character name was changed to Harvey A. Kavanaugh and the role of Maggie was recast with Christine Lahti in one of her early acting roles. The supporting cast includes Barry Van Dyke as Stuart Stafford, Maggie's boyfriend and co-worker (whom Harvey dislikes), and Milton Selzer as Jake Winkleman, Harvey's hard-working agent.
 
The Harvey Korman Show was broadcast Tuesday nights on ABC at 9:30 p.m. throughout its brief run. It was videotaped before a live audience at NBC Studios in Burbank, California. The theme song "Living Life Today", written by Ken Welch & Mitzi Welch, was performed by Korman in a Broadway-esque manner. Garry Shandling was one of the scriptwriters and story editor for the series.

Episodes

Reception
The Harvey Korman Show drew low ratings and was cancelled after only five episodes aired. Korman himself expressed disappointment with the series and blamed its failure on the writing which he said "wasn't up to snuff" and also added that he wasn't happy with the casting either.

References

External links
 
 The Harvey Korman Show

1978 American television series debuts
1978 American television series endings
1970s American sitcoms
American Broadcasting Company original programming
English-language television shows
Television series about actors
Television shows set in Los Angeles
Television shows filmed in Los Angeles
Television series by ABC Studios